The Zibelemärit (Bernese German dialect) is an annual market with aspects of a fair in the old town of Bern, Switzerland. It takes place the fourth Monday in November.

History 

According to this legend, the Bernese awarded the people from the nearby city of Fribourg the right to sell onions in the city in reward for their aid after a fire destroyed much of Bern in 1405.

Description 

As the name indicates, it is mainly onions that are sold on the Zibelemärit. Bernese farmers, who are proud of their decorative onion tresses and onion wreaths, also sell other onion products on the market, including Zwiebelkuchen (onion pie), onion soup and onion sausages. Decorative chains of sugar onions are also popular with children.

The Zibelemärit opens very early in the day, at around 03:00 to 04:00. Later in the morning, the narrow alleys are usually packed tight with people, which is what the Bernese call the Gstungg. A general confetti battle in which mostly children participate ensues at four o'clock in the afternoon, officially ending the market.

Notes and references 

  Zibelemärit on g26.ch

Culture in Bern
Food markets
Tourist attractions in Bern